The 1937 Tour of Flanders was held in 1937.

General classification

Final general classification

References
Résultats sur siteducyclisme.net
Résultats sur cyclebase.nl

External links
 

Tour of Flanders
1937 in road cycling
1937 in Belgian sport